Gustavo Rivera (born 4 June 1993) is a Puerto Rican international footballer who plays as a defender.

Career
Rivera has played for IMG Academy.

After playing for the Puerto Rico under-20 team, he made his senior international debut for Puerto Rico in 2011, and has appeared in FIFA World Cup qualifying matches.

References

1993 births
Living people
Puerto Rican footballers
Puerto Rico international footballers
Association football defenders
Barry Buccaneers men's soccer players
Sportspeople from San Juan, Puerto Rico